Fort Algernon (also spelled Fort Algernourne) was established in the fall of 1609 at the mouth of Hampton Roads at Point Comfort in the Virginia Colony. A strategic point for guarding the shipping channel leading from the Chesapeake Bay, Fort Monroe was built there beginning in the 1830s. The area is now known as Old Point Comfort. Long part of Elizabeth City County, the site is now located in the independent city of Hampton, Virginia.

After Captain John Smith, President of the Council at Jamestown was deposed in September 1609 and soon returned to England, Captain James Davis, who arrived with one of the ships of the Third Supply, assumed command of the newly built fort in October. It is likely that his pinnace, Virginia, the first ship built in the English colonies (at the Virginia Company of Plymouth's failed Popham Colony in present-day Maine), was anchored nearby.   

The fort was very close to the Kecoughtans village, and in one of the acts leading to the First Anglo-Powhatan War, this village was attacked and captured by English colonists on July 9, 1610, who built then there another fort, named Fort Charles. 

In mid-1611, a fire accidentally destroyed all of Fort Algernon except for Davis' own house and the storehouse; however, Davis quickly rebuilt it as before.

External links
Round about Jamestown by Jane Eliza Davis, page 37
The Virginia magazine of history and biography, page 119
Caert Vande Riuer POWHATAN Geleg in Niew Nederlandt by Johannes Vingboons

1609 establishments in Virginia
Buildings and structures in Hampton, Virginia
Colony of Virginia
Algernon